Rastrognathia is a monotypic genus of worms belonging to the monotypic family Rastrognathiidae. The only species is Rastrognathia macrostoma.

The species is found in Scandinavia.

References

Gnathostomulida
Platyzoa genera
Monotypic animal genera